St. Patrick's Parochial Residence-Convent and School is a historic Roman Catholic parochial residence (rectory and convent), and school complex located at Elmira in Chemung County, New York. The structures are across from St. Patrick's Catholic Church.

The residence was built in 1884 and is a two-story brick structure in the Second Empire style. It has been adapted for senior citizen housing. The school was erected in 1892-1894 and is a hipped roof, three story structure on a high basement in the Second Renaissance Revival style. The architect for the residence was Huron O. Smith, and the architects for the school were Pierce & Bickford, all of Elmira.

It was listed on the National Register of Historic Places in 1992.

References

Roman Catholic Diocese of Rochester
Churches in Elmira, New York
Properties of religious function on the National Register of Historic Places in New York (state)
Second Empire architecture in New York (state)
Religious buildings and structures completed in 1884
National Register of Historic Places in Chemung County, New York